Maserati 350S is a series of three racing cars made by Italian automobile manufacturer Maserati, built by Giulio Alfieri, with aluminum body design by Medardo Fantuzzi, both Maserati engineers. The 350S was built to experiment with a new straight-six engine while a V8 engine was being developed in the factory. 

The engine used in the car was heavily revised for racing purposes and the completed unit shared little resemblance to the engine it was based on. Two different variants were made. One featured a dry sump lubrication system while the other features a wet sump lubrication system. The engine was installed in a strengthened chassis of a 300S.

The first chassis #3501 was developed in 1955, using the chassis of a 300S, and the 3.5-litre straight-six engine under development for the future 3500 GT. It was crashed by Stirling Moss in the 1956 Mille Miglia, then factory rebuilt as the first 450S prototype fitted with a V8 engine. During the 1960s it was acquired and heavily modified by Tom Meade (he previously did the same to #3503), only to be purchased and completely restored during the 1980s by its current owner, Franco Lombardi.

Chassis #3502 was, like the first one, upgraded by the factory to the 450S specifications in 1956, then sold to Tony Parravano.

Chassis #3503 (third) was built along #3502. It first used the straight-six, but was converted to a 3.5-litre V12 engine. It took part to several races in 1957 driven by Luigi Piotti, Roberto Bonomi, Hans Herrmann, and Jean Behra. In the early 1960s it was bought, rebuilt and modified by Tom Meade, but was destroyed beyond repair in a 1966 road accident in California. There is a replica of this car, based on the different chassis of a Maserati 3500 GT, which is occasionally exhibited at events such as the 1992 Mille Miglia.

References

350S
Sports racing cars

sv:Maserati 300S